The 1976 Gulf British League season was the 42nd season of the top tier of speedway in the United Kingdom and the 12th season known as the British League.

Summary
The White City Rebels made their debut as did 1975 National League champions Birmingham Brummies. Oxford Cheetahs dropped down a division with White City inheriting both their riders and their nickname. The league was sponsored by Gulf Oil for a second season. 

Ipswich Witches won their second consecutive title. The Witches team was once again headed by John Louis and Billy Sanders but this time Tony Davey also scored well with an average of 8.37, resulting in a comfortable league title success for the Suffolk team. The team then went on to claim the double on 28 October by winning the Knockout Cup.

Wimbledon Dons had the worst possible start to a season when their leading rider and the man touted to be a world champion Tommy Jansson died during a 1976 Individual Speedway World Championship meeting in Stockholm, on 20 May.

Final table
M = Matches; W = Wins; D = Draws; L = Losses; Pts = Total Points

British League Knockout Cup
The 1976 Speedway Star British League Knockout Cup was the 38th edition of the Knockout Cup for tier one teams. Ipswich Witches were the winners.

First round

Second round

Quarter-finals

Semi-finals

Final

First leg

Second leg

Ipswich Witches were declared Knockout Cup Champions, winning on aggregate 91-63.

Final leading averages

Riders & final averages
Belle Vue

 11.06
 9.53
 7.56
 6.34
 5.75
 5.37
 5.18
 4.41
 3.83

Birmingham

 8.00
 6.71
 6.69
 6.07
 5.23
 4.99
 4.72
 4.37
 1.78
 1.00

Coventry

 11.05
 8.26
 6.81
 6.67
 6.53
 4.64
 4.60
 2.10

Cradley Heath

 9.79 
 9.16
 7.72
 5.71 
 5.21
 5.20 
 3.16

Exeter

 10.86
 9.24 
 6.99
 6.45
 5.16
 4.86
 3.54
 3.48
 2.23

Hackney

 10.18 
 7.92 
 6.67
 6.33
 5.51
 5.37
 4.95
 4.80
 4.18

Halifax

 8.74
 7.69
 7.49
 5.98
 5.87
 4.95
 4.46
 4.00
 3.29
 3.14

Hull

 8.94 
 8.86
 8.75
 7.55
 7.50
 6.17
 6.07
 5.88
 5.69

Ipswich

 11.08 
 9.44
 8.37
 6.21
 5.87
 5.71
 4.21
 3.87
 3.70

King's Lynn

 9.71 
 9.43 
 7.83 
 5.68
 5.40
 4.56
 3.85
 3.50
 2.80

Leicester

 9.28
 7.89
 7.86
 5.08 
 4.53
 3.86
 3.08
 2.37
 0.76

Newport

 10.67 
 9.70
 7.41
 6.15
 5.00
 4.90
 4.71
 4.62
 4.17
 3.92

Poole

 10.17
 7.14
 6.67
 6.16
 5.05
 5.04
 4.32

Reading

 10.35
 9.33
 6.75
 6.42
 5.37
 5.16
 3.67
 2.32

Sheffield

 9.62
 8.51
 5.80
 5.36
 5.23
 3.72
 3.21
 3.08
 3.03

Swindon

 9.88
 9.22 
 7.62
 6.46
 6.38
 6.02
 5.52
 3.89
 2.00

White City

 9.69
 7.76
 7.07
 6.67
 6.00
 5.34
 5.05
 4.85
 3.41

Wimbledon

 10.25 (only 8 matches)
 7.32
 7.27
 7.24
 4.14
 4.10
 4.05
 3.91
 2.13

Wolverhampton

 8.97
 7.58
 7.55
 4.95
 4.89
 3.84
 3.22

See also
List of United Kingdom Speedway League Champions
Knockout Cup (speedway)

References

British League
1976 in British motorsport
1976 in speedway